Victor Hernández Stumpfhauser (born 13 April 1980 in Morelia, Michoacán) is a Mexican musician and film score composer.

Education and career 
Hernández Stumpfhauser is one of the newer generations of Mexican film composers, he is an alumnus of the National Autonomous University of Mexico's National School of Music, who graduated with a bachelor's degree with honors in piano performance. His work has been showcased in various feature and short films, including the double Primetime Emmy award-winning television movie Hemingway & Gellhorn. He wrote and/or performed three musical pieces for the multiple Academy Award-winning motion picture by Alejandro González Iñárritu, Birdman or (The Unexpected Virtue of Ignorance).

More recently, Hernández Stumpfhauser wrote the score for the Quirino Award winning animated feature film Ana y Bruno (2018).

Awards

Filmography

Films
Lioness of Lisabi (2008) (short film)
How I Killed Mumblecore (2009)
Quarter 'til Two (2009) (short film)
Black Swan 2: Epidemic (2011) (short film)
Aquí entre nos (2011)
Victims of Gravity (2011)
Field of Dreams 2: Lockout (2011)
Cuando estemos juntos (2011)
Casi treinta (2014)
Birdman or (The Unexpected Virtue of Ignorance) (2014) (performer)
The Hours with You (2014)
Alivio (2015)
Me estás matando, Susana (2016)
Siempre Contigo(2016)
Helena (2016)
Everybody Loves Somebody (2017)
Ana y Bruno (2018)
Souvenir (2018)

Television
Sesame Street (2012–15) (additional music)
Diablo Guardián (2017)

References

External links 
Official website

Living people
Mexican film score composers
Male film score composers
Mexican male composers
Mexican pianists
Musicians from Michoacán
People from Morelia
National Autonomous University of Mexico alumni
1980 births
Male pianists
21st-century pianists
21st-century male musicians